Inorganic Chemistry is a biweekly peer-reviewed scientific journal published by the American Chemical Society since 1962. It covers research in all areas of inorganic chemistry.

The current editor-in-chief is William B. Tolman (Washington University).

Abstracting and indexing
The journal is abstracted and indexed in:

According to the Journal Citation Reports, the journal has a 2021 impact factor of 5.436.

See also 
 Organometallics

References

External links 
 

American Chemical Society academic journals
Biweekly journals
Publications established in 1962
English-language journals
Inorganic chemistry journals